This is a list of the 90 members of the sixth Northern Ireland Assembly, the unicameral devolved legislature of Northern Ireland. The election took place on 2 March 2017, with counting finishing the following day; voter turnout was estimated at 64.8%.

Only five (rather than six) MLAs were elected from each of the 18 constituencies, following the Assembly Members (Reduction of Numbers) Act (Northern Ireland) 2016. The reduction negatively affected Unionist candidates whose bloc lost its majority for the first time in the history of the Assembly. The SDLP was also negatively impacted, losing its only West Belfast seat.

Incumbent Speaker Robin Newton informally convened the Assembly on 22 March to pay tribute to the former deputy First Minister Martin McGuinness, who had died the day before.

However, with the DUP and Sinn Féin unable to agree to form their mandatory coalition government, the Assembly did not formally convene. On 27 April, talks were paused until after a snap general election on 8 June, with a deadline of 29 June 2017 for the parties to reach agreement, but this deadline was repeatedly extended over the next three years. The DUP, Sinn Féin and other parties finally agreed terms on 10 January 2020.

Party strengths

Graphical representation
Parties arranged roughly on the nationalist-unionist spectrum

MLAs by party 

† Co-opted to replace an elected MLA

‡ Changed affiliation during the term

MLAs by constituency 

† Co-opted to replace an elected MLA
‡ Changed affiliation during the term

Changes since the election

† Co-options

‡ Changes in affiliation

Notes

References 

 
Lists of members of the Northern Ireland Assembly